Julian Cumberbatch (10 May 1877 – 16 March 1944) was a Barbadian cricketer. He played in one first-class match for the Barbados cricket team in 1907/08.

See also
 List of Barbadian representative cricketers

References

External links
 

1877 births
1944 deaths
Barbadian cricketers
Barbados cricketers
People from Saint Michael, Barbados